The High Sheriff of Hertfordshire was an ancient Sheriff title originating in the time of the Angles, not long after the foundation of the Kingdom of England, which was in existence for around a thousand years. On 1 April 1974, under the provisions of the Local Government Act 1972, the title of Sheriff of Hertfordshire was retitled High Sheriff of Hertfordshire. The High Shrievalties are the oldest secular titles under the Crown in England and Wales, their purpose being to represent the monarch at a local level, historically in the shires.

The office was a powerful position in earlier times, as sheriffs were responsible for the maintenance of law and order and various other roles. It was only in 1908 under Edward VII of the United Kingdom that the Lord Lieutenant became more senior than the High Sheriff. Since then the position of High Sheriff has become more ceremonial, with many of its previous responsibilities transferred to High Court judges, magistrates, coroners, local authorities and the police.

Below is a list of Sheriffs and High Sheriffs of Hertfordshire.

List of Sheriffs of Hertfordshire

Prior to 1567 the Sheriff of Essex was also the sheriff of Hertfordshire.
Anno 9 Elizabeth : This County was severed from that of Essex, and found Sheriffs by themselves.
Before 1567 see Sheriff of Essex
1567 Sir George Penruddock of Broxbourne, Hertfordshire
1568 Rowland Lytton – Knebworth
1569 Henry Coningsby – North Mimms
1570 William Doddes
1571 Edward Baeshe of Stanstead Abbots (1st term)
1572 George Horsey of Digswell
1573 Thomas Leventhorpe – Shingey Hall
1574 Henry Cocke of Broxbourne, Hertfordshire
1575 John Gill – Wyddial
1576 Thomas Bowles – Wallington
1577 Edmond Verney – Pendley
1578 Philip Boteler – Watton
1579 Charles Moryson – Cassiobury
1580 Thomas Docwray of Putteridge Bury
1581 Sir John Brocket – Hatfield
1582 Henry Coningsby – North Mimms
1583 Francis Heydon – The Grove, Watford
1584 Edward Baeshe of Stanstead Abbots (2nd term)
1585 Henry Capell of Hadham Hall
1586 Edward Pulter – Bradfield
1587 Thomas Leventhorpe
1588 Sir John Cutts
1589 Edmond Verney – Pendley
1590 Walter Mildmay – Pishiobury
1591 Thomas Hanchet
1592 Arthur Capel – Hadham Hall
1593 John Leventhorpe – Shingey Hall
1594 Rowland Lytton of Knebworth House
1595 Sir Thomas Sadleir of Standon
1596 Ralph Coningsby of North Mimms
1597 Richard Spencer of Offley
1598 Thomas Pope Blount – Tittenhanger
1599 Robert Chester – Royston
1600 Thomas Hanchet
1601 Thomas Bowles – Wallington
1602 Sir Edward Denny – Waltham Abbey

James I
1603 Sir Henry Boteler – Hatfield
1604 Sir George Peryent – Digswell
1605 Thomas Docwra – Putteridge Bury (son of Thomas, HS 1580)
1606 Sir Leonard Hide – Throcking
1607 Sir John Leventhorpe – Shingey Hall
1608 Nicholas Trott of Quickswood in Clothill
1609 Ralph Sadleir – Standon
1610 Sir Richard Anderson – Pendley
1611 Sir Robert Boteler – Watton
1612 John Wild –
1613 William Frankland of Rye House
1614 Sir Thomas Dacres, snr of Cheshunt (died 1615) then (Aug–Nov) Thomas Dacres jnr of Cheshunt
1615 Sir Goddard Pemberton of Hertingfordbury (died August 1616)
1616 Lewis Pemberton – St Albans
1616 Thomas Newce – Hadham
1617 Edward Briscoe – Aldenham
1618 Thomas Read – Hatfield
1619 Sir Nicholas Hyde, 1st Baronet – North Mimms
1620 Roger Pemberton – St Albans
1621 William Hale – King's Walden
1622 Edward Newport – Pelham
1623 Sir Clement Scudamore – North Mimms
1624 Richard Sidley – Digswell

Charles I
1625: William Lytton of Knebworth
1626: John Jennings
1627: Sir Thomas Hyde, 2nd Baronet (son of Nicholas, HS 1620)
1628: Edward Gardiner
1629: William Hoe
1630: John Boteler K.B. of Watton Woodhall, Watton-at-Stone
1631:
1632: Richard Hale – King's Walden
1633: Henry Coghill
1634: William Plomer
1635: William Priestley
1636: William Leman
1636: Ralph Freeman
1637: Thomas Coningesby
1638: Thomas Hewett of Pishiobury, Sawbridgeworth
1639: John Gore
1640: Richard Cole
1641: Arthur Pulter
1642: John Garrett
1644: Robert Jesselyn
1644: Charles Noles
1646: Richard Harlakenden of Earls Colne, Essex

Commonwealth
1648 Francis Flyer
1648 Rowland Hale
1650 John Rowley of Berkway
1651 Thomas Keightley of Hertingfordbury Park
1652 John Fotherley
1654 Humfrey Shatcrosse of Hatfield
1654 Sir John Barrington
1655 Sir John Reade
1658 Sir John Wittewrong, 1st Baronet

Charles II
1662 Rowland Lytton of Knebworth House
12 November 1665: Sir Jonathan Keate, 1st Baronet, of the Hoo, Kimpton
7 November 1666: Edward Chester
6 November 1667: John Ellis
6 November 1668: Israel Mayo
11 November 1669: Sir Thomas Byde, of Ware Park
4 November 1670: Henry Baldwin
9 November 1671: Sir John Reade
3 December 1671: Samuel Reves
11 November 1672: Thomas Priestley
12 November 1673: Sir John Reade
6 May 1674: Henry Coghill, of Aldenham 
5 November 1674: Joshua Lomax
15 November 1675: Sir John Reade, 1st Baronet
9 February 1675: Edward Chester Royston
9 November 1676: Sir John Reade, 1st Baronet
10 November 1676: Sir William Leman, 2nd Baronet of Northaw
15 November 1677: Sir John Reade, 1st Baronet
late 1677: Sir Robert Jocelyn
14 November 1678: William Lisson
13 November 1679: Thomas Halsey
4 November 1680: Sir John Butler
1681 Sir Michael Miller
1682 James Wilmot
1683 Sir Thomas Feild 
1684 James Gulston 
1685 Joseph Edmunds
1686 Francis Floyer 
1687 Basil Moor jnr
1688 William Hutchinson of Astwell

William and Mary
1689 (Mar–Nov) Robert Harley of Brampton Bryan
1689 Thomas Shatterden – Hatfield 
John Plumer – Blakesware
1690 Sir John Garrard, 3rd Baronet of Lamer 
1691 George Hadley – East Barnet
1692 Sir John Bucknall of Oxhey Place, Watford 
1693 Sir James Read – Hatfield 
1694 William Dyer – Newenham

William III
1695 Sir Thomas Rolt – Sacomb
1696 John Gape of Harpsfield Hall, St Albans
1697 John Billers – Thorley
1698 Thomas Auncel – Ickleford
1699 Henry Gore – Gilston
1700 George Nodes – Shephall
1701 Thomas Blackmore

Anne
1702 Robert Hadsley – Munden
1703 Edmond Field – Stansted
1704 Philip Boteler – Watton
1705 Joseph Huntsman
1706 Barnard Halpenny
1707 Henry Houblon – London
1708 Richard Sheppard
1709 Sir Richard Houblon – London
1710 William Robinson Lytton of Knebworth House then William Berners of Moore Place, Much Hadham
1711 Henry Ewer
1712 William Smith
1713 Charles Felton

George I
1714 Henry Long – Bayford
1715 John Duncomb
1716 William Bucknall
1717 Pulter Forester – Bradfield
1718 James Fleet – Tewin
1719 John Nichols
1720 Sir Charles Buck – Watford
1721 Edward Radcliffe – Hitchin
1722 Thomas Kentish – St Albans
1723 John Seer – Yardley
1724 Henry Sibley – Yardley
 Thomas Sibley
1725 Samuel Poynter – Kelshall
1726 Richard Warren – Tewin

George II
1727 Benedict Ithel – Hitchin
1729 Edward Searle replaced by John Turvin of Gilston
1730 Francis Goulston – Wyddial
1731 Richard Chase
1732 Thomas Wooton
1733 William Freeman – Aspenden Hall
1734 Richard Tuach – Rickmersworth
1735 Thomas Rolt – Sacomb
1736 John Dean – Wormley
1737 Robert Plummer
1738 William Gape – St Albans
1739 William Benn – West Mill
1740 William Shaw – Cheshunt
1741 Robert Hadsley – Jenningsbury
1742 Geo Carpenter – Redburn
1743 Thomas Ansell – Ickleford
1744 Richard Chase – Much Hadham
1745 Sir Conyers Jocelyn – Hyde Hall
1746 Charles Halsey – Great Gaddesden
1747 Edward Chester – Albury replaced by Henry Fotherley Whitfield – Rickmersworth
1748 William Janssen – Cheshunt
1749 Nicholson Calvert – Hunsdon House
1750 John Cheshyre – Thundridgebury
1751 Thomas Whittewronge – Harpenden
1752 Benedict Ithel – Preston
1753 Caleb Lomax – Childwickbury
1754 Fitzwilliam Barrington – Lilley
1755 Giles Thornton Heysham – Paul's Walden
1756 John Turvin – Gilston
1757 Jacob Houblon – West Mill
1758 John Robinson Lytton of Knebworth House
1759 Sir John Chapman of Cockenhatch
1760 Benjamin Trueman – Hatfield

George III
1761 John Ashfordby – Cheshunt
1762 Henry Fotherley Whitfield – Rickmansworth
1763 John Cope Freeman – Abbots Langley
1764 David Williams – Sarratt
1765 Bibye Lake – St Margaret's
1766 John Seare – Tring
1767: Samuel Whitbread, of Bedwell Park
1768 Lionel Lyde, later Sir Lionel Lyde, 1st Baronet – Ayot St Lawrence
1769 Jeremiah Hadsley – Barkway
1770 Henry Green – Gaddesden Hoo
1771 George Prescott – Theobalds
1772 Samuel Moody – Watford
1773 John Dorrien – Berkhamsted St Peter's
1774 Sir Abraham Hume, 2nd Baronet – Wormley Bury
1775 Richard Emmott – Goldings
1776 Thomas Harwood – Preston
1777 John Searancke – Hatfield
1778 Thomas Blackmore – Hunsdon
1779 Richard Baker – Hertingfordbury
1780 John Hunter of Gubbins, Potter's Bar
1781 Thomas Clutterbuck – Watford
1782 John Mickie – North Mimms
1783 Robert Machy – Tewin
1784 John Thomas Ellis of Wyddial Hall
1785 William Phillimore – Aldenham
1786 Jeremiah Milles – Pishiobury
1787 John Roper of Berkhamsted st Peter
1788 Charles Bourchier of Shenley
1789 Drummond Smith of Tring Park
1790 Samuel Robert Gaussen of Brookman's Park, North Mimms
1791 Matthew Raper of Ashlyns Hall
1792 James Bourchier of Shenley
1793 Sir George William Prescott, 1st Baronet of Theobalds
1794 Samuel Lightenhouse of Orford House
1795 James Harding of Tring
1796 John Sowerby of Lilley
1797 Sir John Sebright, 7th Baronet of Beechwood
1798 Felix Calvert – Hunsdon House
1799 Archibald Paxton – Watford Place
5 February 1800: Justinian Casamajor, of Potterells
11 February 1801: Thomas Fitzherbert, of Shenley
3 February 1802: Jacob Bosanquet, of Broxbourne Park
3 February 1803: Henry Brown, of North Mimms Place
1 February 1804: Edward Garrow, of Totteridge
6 February 1805: Emilius Henry Delmé-Radcliffe, of Hitchin Priory
1 February 1806: George Sullivan Marten, of Sandridge Lodge
4 February 1807: George Caswall, of Sacombe Park
3 February 1808: James Smyth, of Ashlyns Hall
6 February 1809: Edmond Darby, of Aston Bury
31 January 1810: Thomas Haworth, of Boreham Lodge
8 February 1811: Robert Taylor, of Tolmers
24 January 1812: John Currie, of Essendon
10 February 1813: John Fam Timins, of Aldenham
4 February 1814: Nicholas Segar Parry, of Little Hadham
13 February 1815: Andrew Reid, of Chipping Barnet
1816 Daniel Giles of Youngsbury, Ware
1817 Edmund Morris of Chorleywood
1818 George Palmer – Much Hadham
1819 Samuel Unwin Heathcote – Shephallbury

George IV
1820 John Earley Cook – Nunsbury
1821 Joseph Timperon – New Barnet
1822 Thomas Daniell – Little Berkhampstead
1823 Robert Sutton – Rossway, Northchurch
1824 Patrick Haydon – Colney Chapel
1825 Thomas Nash Kemble – Gubbins Park
1826 Sir George Duckett – Roydon
1827 Joseph Andrew Latour – Hexton Manor
1828 Sir Culling Smith – Bedwell Park
1829 Charles Phelips – Briggins Park

William IV
1830 William Hale – King's Walden
1831 Augustus Smith – Ashlyns Hall first appointed, replaced by Hon Thomas Robert Dimsdale, Baron Dimsdale – Camfield Place
1832 Robert Plumer Ward – Gilston Park
1833 George Jacob Bosanquet – Broxbourne Bury
1834 Wiliam Robert Phillimore – Newberries
1835 William Robert Baker – Bayfordbury
1836 William Blake – Danesbury

Victoria
1837 George Proctor – Bennington
1838 Claude George Thornton – Tewin
1839 Charles Benet Drake Gerard – Lamer Park
1840 Charles Snell Chauncy – Little Munden
1841 Robert William Gaussen – Brookmans
1842 George Gould Morgan of Brickendonbury
1843 Charles John Dimsdale – Essendon Place
1844 Frederick Cass – Little Grove
1845 Sir Henry Meux, 2nd Baronet – Theobalds Park
1846 Felix Calvert – Hunsdon House
1847 Humphrey Harper Burchell – Bushey Grange
1848 William Parker – Ware Park
1849 Abel Smith – Woodhall Park
1850 Fulke Southwell Greville – North Mimms Park
1851 William John Lysley – Mymms
1852 Wynn Ellis – Ponsbourne Park
1853 Sir Thomas Gage Sebright – Beechwood Park
1854 Robert Hanbury – Poles
1855 Nathaniel Hibbert – Munden
1856 William Joseph Myers – Porters
1857 William Reid – Codicote
1858 William Wilshere – Welwyn
1859 Martin Hadsley Gosselin – Ware
1860 James Bentley – Cheshunt
1861 William Jones Loyd – Langleybury
1862 John Hodgson – Gilston Park
1863 Samuel Richard Block – Barnet
1864 Sir Astley Paston Cooper – Gadesbridge
1865 Forster Alleyne McGeachy – Shenley Hill
1866 Henry Heyman Toulmin – Childwickbury
1867 Charles Booth – Stanstead Abbotts
1868 Robert Pryor – Watford
1869 Robert Smith – Goldings
1870 Unwin Unwin Heathcote – Shephallbury
1871 Charles Longman – Shendish
1872 Thomas Curtis – Great Berkhampstead
1873 HJ Smith – Bosanquet – Broxbournebury
1874 Sir John Gage Sebright – Beechwood
1875 James Sydney Walker – Hunsdonbury
1876 John Gwyn Jeffreys – Ware Priory
1877 David Carnegie – Watford
1878 Thomas Fowell Buxton – Ware
1879 Charles Butler – Hatfield
1880 Charles Cholmondely Hale – King's Walden
1881 John Evans – Hemel Hempstead
1882 James William Carlile – Hertford
1883 Salisbury Baxendale – Ware
1884 Henry Hucks Gibbs – Watford
1885 Sir Astley Paston-Cooper – Gadebridge
1886 John Harry Eyres Parker – Ware Park
1887 Henry Wilson Demain-Saunders – Hertford
1888 William Bunce Greenfield – Flamsteadbury
1889 Joseph Grout Williams – Pendley Manor
1890 Hon Arthur Henry Holland-Hibbert – Munden
1891 Edmund Smith Hanbury – Poles, Ware
1892 Richard Benyon Croft – Ware
1893 Robert Barclay – Hoddesdon
1894 Edward Henry Loyd – Langleybury
1895 Edward Salvin Bowlby – Gilston Park
1896 Percival Bosanquet – Ponfield
1897 John Henry Buxton – Hunsdon Bury
1898 Charles Thomas Part – St Albans
1899 Frederick Henry Norman – Much Hadham
1900 Sir George Faudel Faudel-Phillips – Balls Park, Hertford

Edward VII
1901 Major-General Apsley Cherry-Garrard, of Lamer Park – Wheathampstead
1902 Evelyn Simpson – Baldock
1903 Henry Tylston Hodgson – Harpenden
1904 Sir Edgar Reginald Sebright – Beechwood
1905 Thomas Fenwick Harrison – King's Walden Bury
1906 Hellier Gosselin-Grimshawe – Bengeo Hall
1907 Benjamin Samuel Faudel-Phillips – Hertford
1908 Arthur Salvin Bowlby – Gilston Park
1909 Edward Ernest Pearson – Brickendonbury
1910 Sir Alfred Reynolds – Ayot Bury

George V
1911 Major Richard Page Croft – Ware
1912 Maurice George Carr Glyn – Hadham
1913 The Hon Herbert Cokayne Gibbs – Briggens, Nr Ware
1914 Lewis Evans – Watford
1915 Henry William Clinton Baker – Bayfordbury
1916 Walter Reynolds – St Albans
1917 The Hon Charles Robert Southwell, Baron Dimsdale – Meesden
1918 Capt Hubert Laurie Bullen – Hatfield
1919 Major-Gen Sir Charles Haddon – Great Berkhamsted
1920 John Ramsay Drake – St Albans
1921 Sir Arthur Cory-Wright – Welwyn
1922 Col Sir Edward Hildred Carlile – Hertford
1923 Capt George Strachan Pawle – Widford
1924 BrigGen Sir Brodie Henderson – Little Berkhamsted
1925 Sir Charles Alexander Nall-Cain – Hatfield
1926 Sir Alexander William Lewis – Essendon
1927 Lt Col Osmond McMullen – Ware
1928 George Richard Smith-Bosanquet – Broxbourne
1929 Capt Everard Martin-Smith – Codicote
1930 Charles Morland Agnew – Croxley Green
1931 Sir Walter Lawrence – Sawbridgeworth
1932 Major John Fenwick Harrison – King's Waldenbury
1933 Sir Lionel Faudel-Philips – Hertford
1934 Capt Robert Humphrey Haslam – Berkhamsted

George V and Edward VIII 
1935 Lt Colonel Wilfred Hubert Wild – St Albans

Edward VIII and George VI
1936 Col Sir Geoffrey Selby Church, Bt., MC. – Hatfield

George VI
1937 Arthur Edwin Cutforth – Sawbridgeworth
1938 Henry Fowell Buxton – Ware
1939 Capt Sir Cecil Gustavus Newman – Royston
1940 Capt Reginald Henry Abel-Smith – Hatfield
1941 Major Albert Pam – Broxbourne
1942 The Rt Hon Sir Felix Cassel – Luton
1943 Col William Hilton Briggs – Watford
1944 Michael Bruce Urquhart Dewar – Hitchin
1945 Capt Sir Humphrey Edmund de Trafford – Royston
1946 Sir Patrick Ashley Cooper – Hexton Manor
1947 Capt Francis Pawle – Ware
1948 Brig Edward Henry Beddington – Much Hadham
1949 Brig Walter Hugh Crosland – Little Berkhamsted
1950 The Hon David Bowes-Lyon – St Paul's Walden Bury
1951 Col Sir William Henry Dyke Acland – Welwyn

Elizabeth II 
1952 Charles Maynard – Potters Bar
1953 Thomas Abel Smith – Hertford
1954 Col John Maitland – Welwyn
1955 Lt Col Robert McMullen – Buntingford
1956 Sir William Cooper – Berkhamsted
1957 Charles Wentworth-Stanley – Sawbridgeworth
1958 John Buxton – Wareside
1959 Lt Col Francis Fremantle – Hertford
1960 Brigadier Richard Hanbury – Braughing
1961 Maj Adrian Hadden-Paton – Berkhamsted
1962 Arthur Proctor – Harlow
1963 Douglas Cory-Wright – Harpenden
1964 Leopold Seymour – Hadham
1965 Lucius Thompson-McCausland – Hertford
1966 Sir Aubrey Burke – Bovingdon
1967 Ronald Pilkington – Stanstead Abbotts
1968 James Ashley Cooper – Hexton Manor
1969 Julian Martin Smith – Berkhamsted
1970 Sir Frederick Seebohm – Chapmore End
1971 Lt Col James Thompson – Stevenage
1972 David Wentworth-Stanley – Munden
1973 Charles Wentworth-Stanley – Sawbridgeworth

Arms

List of High Sheriffs of Hertfordshire

20th century

21st century
2000 The Revd Teddy Faure Walker DL of Sandon
2001 Christopher Maurice Laing OBE DL of Ayot St Lawrence
2002 The Countess of Verulam of St Albans
2003 Lady Lyell (Susanna) of Markyate
2004 Lady Nichols (Shelagh) of Bucks Hill
2005 David McMullen DL of Westmill
2006 William Tudor John DL of Willian
2007 Howard Guard of Radlett
2008 Paul David Cherry of Weston
2009 Jane Wentworth-Stanley of Great Munden
2010 Gerald Michael Nolan Corbett of Redbourn
2011 Lord Charles Cecil of Hatfield
2012 The Hon. Mrs Arabella Clare Stuart-Smith of Bedmond, Abbots Langley
2013 Viscountess Trenchard, Standon, Ware
2014 Fergus J McMullen of The Old Vicarage, Berden, Bishop's Stortford
2015 Jonathan Charles Gosselin Trower of Stanstead Bury, Stanstead Abbotts, Ware
2016 Stelio Haralambos Stefanou of Tewin
2017 William Arthur Hobhouse of Sarratt
2018 Mrs Suzana Rose Harvey of Wickham Hall, Bishop's Stortford
2019 Mrs Sarah Margaret Beazley of Buntingford
2020 The Hon. Henry Thurstan Holland-Hibbert of Watford
2021 Lionel C. Wallace DL of St Albans
2022: Mrs Sally Denise Burton
2023: Mrs Margaret Elizabeth Green

Website
high sheriff of hertfordshire

References
Where no other source is indicated, the name has been taken from the Shrievalty's own list, List of High Sheriffs

 
High Shrievalties in England
Local government in Hertfordshire
People from Hertfordshire
High Sheriffs of Hertfordshire